Kielmeyera neriifolia is a species of Kielmeyera from Brazil.

References

External links
 
 

neriifolia
Flora of Brazil